There are a wide range of recreational areas and facilities in Colorado Springs, Colorado.

History
The first city park in Colorado Springs, included in the initial town plans in 1871, is Acacia Park. It was initially called Acacia Square or North Park. General William Jackson Palmer donated land to establish Acacia and additional parks, including: Antlers Park, Monument Valley Park, North Cheyenne Cañon, Palmer Park, Pioneer Square Park (South Park), Prospect Lake and Bear Creek Cañon Park. He donated a total of  1,270 acres of land, some of which was also used for scenic drives, tree-lined roadways and foot and bridle paths. The Perkins heirs donated Garden of the Gods to the city in 1909.

Types of parks

State park
The largest park in El Paso County is the 1,680 acre Cheyenne Mountain State Park, which is located in the southern end of Colorado Springs. Its terrain varies from prairie grassland and scrub oak to Douglas fir and ponderosa pine on the peaks at the western side of the park. Throughout the year it offers camping and picnic, 16 miles of hiking and biking trails, and viewing of wildlife, such as red fox, black bear, deer, elk, and mountain lions. There is a visitor center where visitors may learn about park programs and activities. The park has facilities for group events.

City parks
The City of Colorado Springs has community, regional and neighborhood parks.

 Neighborhood parks are up to six acres in size and may offer a combination of playgrounds, picnic areas, walking paths, and sports fields or courts. There are 135 neighborhood parks, totaling 903.9 acres as of May, 2013.
 Community parks may range from 35 to 175 acres and offer larger facilities for sports activities, such as skateboarding, in-line hockey, multi-use fields and other sports facilities. There may be picnic areas, reservable pavilions for large group picnics, and gardens. As of May, 2013, there were 700 acres of community parks, which includes among others Memorial Park and Monument Valley Park.
 Regional parks are generally more than 100 acres which offer outdoor recreation, educational programs, picnic areas and protect the natural resources of the park. The city's regional parks total 7,390.6 acres as of May, 2013. Regional parks include Garden of the Gods, Bear Creek Cañon Park, North Cheyenne Cañon Park, Ute Valley Park and Palmer Park. The North Slope Recreation Area is located along Pikes Peak Highway. Jimmy Camp Creek Park (Jimmy's Camp) is an undeveloped park on East U.S. Highway 24.

Open space
There is a total of 4,702.3 acres of open space in Colorado Springs. The natural settings include rock formations, prairie grasslands, pine forests and hillsides and mountain foothills. Some of the key open space properties include Red Rock Canyon Open Space, Austin Bluffs Open Space, Stratton Open Space, Cheyenne Mountain State Park backdrop, and Blodgett Peak Open Space. Trails are frequently found in the open space. Some open space includes picnic areas; fishing, such as at Pikeview Reservoir #1; and wetlands at Sinton Pond Open Space. Catamount Institute at the Beidleman Environmental Center is located at Sondermann Park.

An additional total of 400 acres is used for Special Resource Areas, which are small open space properties throughout the city. They range from under one acre to 138.6 acres at the Stetson Hills Open Space.

Trails and Open Space Coalition is an organization whose mission includes "the conservation and preservation of open space in Colorado Springs." Individuals may volunteer for projects such as recovery from the Waldo Canyon Fire or projects at specific trails or open space properties, such as Red Rock Canyon, Intemann Trail, Austin Bluffs Open Space or Palmer Park to name a few.

Sports complexes
Aside from the sports fields and courts at the city parks, there are also 20 acre or more sports complexes dedicated to sports programs. The facilities may include a combination of fields for baseball, softball, soccer and football; tennis courts; skateboard parks, in-line skating rinks, aquatic centers and recreation centers. Sports complexes include Four Diamond Sports Complex on N. Nevada, Gossage Sports Complex on Mark Dabling Boulevard, Sky View Sports Complex on Resnick Drive, El Pomar Youth Sports Center on Executive Circle and Leon Young Youth Baseball Complex on S. Chelton. There are also two undeveloped complexes, the Lawrence Ochs Sports Complex, on N. Powers Boulevard, and the Tutt site on Tutt Boulevard.

Nature centers

Bear Creek Regional Park's nature center offers self-guided and guided tours, interpretive programs, presentations, classes and special events. The nature center is free. Trails traverse a prairie landscape, foothills and up to the peaks. It is an El Paso County park, as is the Fountain Creek Nature Center, south of Colorado Springs in the city of Fountain.

Dog parks

The city's dog parks includes the 25 acre Bear Creek Dog Park in the western part of the city, Cheyenne Meadows Dog Park in the south, Palmer Park Dog Park in the north, and Rampart Dog Park, the northernmost park.

There are dog runs on the Dog Loop Trail at Red Rock Canyon Open Space and east of Rock Ledge Ranch Historic Site at Garden of the Gods. There is also a dog run at Yucca Flats in Palmer Park. Colorado Springs was voted number 1 "Best Cities for Dogs" by Men's Health and the number 1 "America's Most Pet-Friendly City" by Forbes magazine.

List

Notes

References

External links

 Colorado Springs Parks
 Trails
 Pikes Peak Greenway map
 Interactive Urban Trails map
 Urban Trails map (pdf)